Michael Carroll Bloom (born April 12, 1952) is a Canadian former professional ice hockey player. He played in the National Hockey League (NHL) with the Washington Capitals and Detroit Red Wings between 1974 and 1977.

Born in Ottawa, Ontario, Bloom was selected in the 1st round of the 1972 NHL Entry Draft, 16th overall, by the Boston Bruins, but never played for Boston before he was claimed by the Washington Capitals in the 1974 NHL Expansion Draft. Bloom also played for the Detroit Red Wings.

Personal life
His father Carroll Bloom played in the CFL for the Ottawa Rough Riders, as well as the Saskatchewan Roughriders in the 1950s. Bloom also played for the Montreal Canadiens farm team in the 1950s.

Career statistics

Regular season and playoffs

References

External links
 
Profile at hockeydraftcentral.com

1952 births
Living people
Boston Braves (AHL) players
Boston Bruins draft picks
Canadian ice hockey left wingers
Detroit Red Wings players
EHC Olten players
Eredivisie (ice hockey) players
Ice hockey people from Ottawa
Kansas City Blues players
Kansas City Red Wings players
National Hockey League first-round draft picks
Rhode Island Reds players
San Diego Gulls (WHL) players
San Diego Mariners (PHL) players
St. Catharines Black Hawks players
Washington Capitals players